Grace King (born 21 June 2000) is an English badminton player. She trained in her hometown in Derbyshire under coach James Boxall and Steve Butler. She made her international debut in 2013 at the Danish Junior Cup. King represented Great Britain at the 2018 Summer Youth Olympics.

Achievements

BWF International Challenge/Series 
Women's doubles

  BWF International Challenge tournament
  BWF International Series tournament
  BWF Future Series tournament

BWF Junior International (1 runner-up) 
Girls' singles

  BWF Junior International Grand Prix tournament
  BWF Junior International Challenge tournament
  BWF Junior International Series tournament
  BWF Junior Future Series tournament

References

External links 
 

2000 births
Living people
Sportspeople from Derby
English female badminton players
Badminton players at the 2018 Summer Youth Olympics